Robert Pirosh (April 1, 1910 – December 25, 1989) was an American motion picture and television screenwriter and director.

Early years
Pirosh was born in Baltimore, Maryland, and graduated from the Baltimore City College high school in 1928. His preparation for a career in Hollywood included study at the Sorbonne in France and the University of Berlin in Germany. When he began looking for work in Hollywood, he used a cover letter that began "Dear Sir, I like words" and concluded,I like the word screenwriter better than copywriter, so I decided to quit my job in a New York advertising agency and try my luck in Hollywood, but before taking the plunge I went to Europe for a year of study, contemplation and horsing around. I have just returned and I still like words. May I have a few with you?
The letter later featured in the book Letters of Note and in 2014 was described by its editor, Shaun Usher, as his "current favorite".

Career
Pirosh began his film career in 1934 as a junior writer for Metro-Goldwyn-Mayer, working with fellow newcomer George Seaton. The two collaborated on the Marx Brothers' 1935 comedy A Night at the Opera and their next film, A Day at the Races, in 1937.  He and Delmer Daves adapted Ayn Rand's Night of January 16th for a 1941 film of the same name directed by William Clemens.  In 1942 he collaborated on the screwball comedy Rings on Her Fingers for Henry Fonda and Gene Tierney.

Pirosh served in World War II as a Master Sergeant with the 320th Regiment, 35th Infantry Division. He saw action in the Ardennes and Rhineland campaigns. During the Battle of the Ardennes, he led a patrol into Bastogne to support the American forces surrounded there.

He earned an Academy Award for Best Writing, Story and Screenplay in 1949 for his script for the World War II drama Battleground, a film he also produced, that was the first based on the Ardennes battle. His work was also honored in other venues that year. Pirosh won the Golden Globe and the Writers Guild of America awards.

In 1951, he was nominated for another Academy Award for the screenplay Go for Broke!. This was his directorial debut. He would go on to write the story for the highly regarded Steve McQueen World War II film Hell Is for Heroes, directed by Don Siegel, believed to be the basis for TV's Combat! (which he created). He also directed 1954's Valley of the Kings and 1955's The Girl Rush.

Pirosh wrote the episode "The Man From Leadville" for the 1976 CBS western television series Sara.

Selected works

The Winning Ticket (1935) – story
A Night at the Opera (1935) – writer (uncredited)
A Day at the Races (1937) – writer
The Wizard of Oz (1939) – writer (uncredited)
The Quarterback (1940) – writer
The Night of January 16th (1941) – writer
Song of the Islands (1942) – writer
Rings on Her Fingers (1942) – writer
I Married a Witch (1942) – writer
Up in Arms (1944) – writer
Man About Town (1947) (US version) – associate producer
Battleground (1949) – story, writer, associate producer
Go for Broke! (1951) – writer, director
Washington Story (1952) – writer, director
Valley of the Kings (1954) – writer, director
The Girl Rush (1955) – writer, director
Spring Reunion (1957) – writer, director
Laramie (1959) (TV series) – writer, producer
The Law and Mr. Jones (1960–61) (TV series) – writer
Bachelor Father (1961) (TV series) – writer
Hell Is for Heroes (1962) – story, writer
A Gathering of Eagles (1963) – writer
Combat! (1962–67) (TV series) – producer, writer, series development
The Fugitive (1963) (TV series) – writer
Alexander the Great (1963) – story, writer
The Guns of Will Sonnett (1968) (TV series) – writer
What's So Bad About Feeling Good? (1968) – writer
The Bold Ones: The New Doctors (1969) (TV series) – writer
Family Affair (1970) (TV series) – writer
To Rome with Love (1970) (TV series) – writer
Ironside (1968–71) (TV series) – writer
My Three Sons (1971) (TV series) – writer
Bonanza (1970–72) (TV series) – writer
Mannix (1970–74) (TV series) – writer
Twice in a Lifetime (1974) (TV movie) – writer
Firehouse (1974) (TV series) – writer
Barnaby Jones (1974) (TV series) – writer
Ellery Queen (1975) (TV series) – writer
The Hardy Boys/Nancy Drew Mysteries (1977) (TV series) – writer
Hawaii Five-O (1977) (TV series) – writer
The Oregon Trail (1977) (TV series) – writer
The Young Pioneers (1978) (TV series) – writer
The Waltons (1979–81) (TV series) – writer
Harry O (1975) (TV series) – writer

Notes

References
 Chandler, Charlotte. (1978). Hello, I Must Be Going: Groucho and His Friends. Garden City, New York: Doubleday. ;   OCLC 3608756
 Davis, Ronald L. (2007). Words into Images: Screenwriters on the Studio System. Jackson, Mississippi: University Press of Mississippi. '   OCLC 237217879
 Niemi, Robert. (2006). History in the Media: Film and Television.	Santa Barbara, California: ABC-Clio. ; OCLC 263634503
 Shapiro, Fred R. (2006). The Yale Book of Quotations. New Haven: Yale University Press. , ;  OCLC 66527213

External links 
 
 
 Biography from Allmovie

1910 births
1989 deaths
American male screenwriters
Best Original Screenplay Academy Award winners
Baltimore City College alumni
Writers from Baltimore
Screenwriters from Maryland
American people of Hungarian descent
American expatriates in France
American expatriates in Germany
University of Paris alumni
20th-century American male writers
20th-century American screenwriters
United States Army non-commissioned officers